The Kerry Hill is a breed of domestic sheep originating in the county of Powys in Wales. It derives its name from the village of Kerry (Ceri), near Newtown. Kerry Hill sheep have a distinctive and unique coloration, with a white face  bearing black markings around the mouth, ears, and eyes. Both rams and ewes are polled. Their wool is white, and their legs are white with black markings. First mentions of the breed date back to the early 19th century, and today it is distributed throughout the United Kingdom, Ireland, the Netherlands, Germany and Denmark. Though still not very numerous, the breed was removed from the records of the Rare Breeds Survival Trust watchlist in 2006. This breed is primarily raised for meat.

The Kerry Hill Flock Book Society keeps a register of pure bred animals and provides information on the breed, shows and sales.

Characteristics
The face is white with black markings on the nose and around the eyes, with black, wool-less ears set high on the head. The legs are white with black markings.

The lambing percentage is often 175% and a terminal sire can be used for a larger carcase. The ewes milk well and the lambs grow fast. They can produce a  carcase at twelve to fourteen weeks, or if overwintered, a  carcase the following spring.

References

Literature
Williams-Davies J (1981/1987), Welsh Sheep and their Wool. Gomer, Llandysul pp.39-42.

External links

 Dutch Kerry Hill association (Dutch)
 Danish Kerry Hill association (Danish)

Sheep breeds originating in Wales
Sheep breeds